Natalia Olegovna Medvedeva (born 15 November 1971) is a former Soviet, CIS and Ukrainian professional tennis player.

Career
She played on the WTA tour from 1987 to 1998. Her four singles titles were won in Nashville, Tennessee in 1990, Linz in 1992, and Prague and Essen in 1993. In Essen, she beat Conchita Martínez, Arantrxa Sánchez, and Anke Huber.

She also won 12 doubles titles. She also won the girls' doubles title at the 1987 Wimbledon Championships, partnering Natalia Zvereva. She reached four Grand Slam quarterfinals in doubles: twice, with Leila Meskhi, in 1990, at the Australian and U.S. Opens. She did it twice again in 1994, with Larisa Savchenko, at the French Open and Wimbledon Championships.

Medvedeva competed 16 times for the Ukraine Fed Cup team, with an 8–8 win–loss record. She came out of retirement for the 2000 Fed Cup because the team was struggling for players.

Personal
Medvedeva's younger brother is Andriy Medvedev, the 1999 French Open finalist. They competed together at the 1995 Hopman Cup, losing in the final to the German team of Anke Huber and Boris Becker.

WTA Tour finals

Singles: 5 (4 titles, 1 runner-up)

Doubles: 13 (12 titles, 1 runner-up)

Team: 1 (1 runner-up)

Top 10 wins

Performance timelines

Singles

Doubles

Mixed doubles

ITF finals

Singles: 5 (4 titles, 1 runner-up)

Doubles: 9 (6 titles, 3 runners-up)

References

External links
 
 
 

1971 births
Living people
Soviet female tennis players
Ukrainian female tennis players
Sportspeople from Kyiv
Hopman Cup competitors
Wimbledon junior champions
Grand Slam (tennis) champions in girls' doubles
Honoured Masters of Sport of the USSR